Glossodoris misakinosibogae is a species of sea slug, a dorid nudibranch, a shell-less marine gastropod mollusk in the family Chromodorididae.

Distribution
This species is found in Japan.

References

External links

Chromodorididae
Gastropods described in 1988